Adam Levine is an American singer, songwriter, multi-instrumentalist, actor, and television personality.

Adam Levin(e) may also refer to:

Adam Levine (press aide), former Bush Administration aide
Adam Levin, fiction author
Adam K. Levin, former director of the New Jersey Division of Consumer Affairs and businessman for consumer credit related businesses